is a 2004 Japanese tokusatsu film directed and co-written by Hideaki Anno. It is an adaptation of the 1970s manga and anime series Cutie Honey.

The film stars popular Japanese model Eriko Sato as the hyperactive Honey. The film loosely retells the classic story of Cutie Honey's battle to defend humanity and avenge her father against Panther Claw. In this version, Honey's powers come from the Imaginary Induction System. Called I-system for short, the name is a pun on the word . Villains Honey faces include Sister Jill, Gold Claw, Cobalt Claw, Scarlet Claw, and Black Claw. The film also features a cameo by series creator Go Nagai.

Cutie Honey was followed two months later by an OVA series, Re: Cutie Honey, based on the film. In North America, the film was released direct-to-DVD on April 17, 2007 by Bandai Entertainment. Previously, the 1994 New Cutie Honey OVA was the only incarnation of Cutie Honey to have been commercially released in the United States.

Main characters

Cutie Honey / Honey Kisaragi
Honey Kisaragi (played by Eriko Sato and voiced by Carrie Keranen in the English dub) is the daughter of professor Kisaragi. She was a normal person until she had an accident where her human body died. Her father saved her by creating an android body and transferring her mind into it. Thanks to the AI system, she is able to transform into almost any identity she needs. When transformed into Cutie Honey, she becomes a powerful warrior wielding a sword. She needs to have energy in order to change from Honey Kisaragi to any of her transformations. When depleted, she has to eat a lot to regain her abilities (her diet solely consists of onigiri and green tea). Her father was killed by the organization Panther Claw, and she vows revenge against them by any means necessary. Although she has a lively and carefree personality, she has no friends and most people take advantage of her naiveté. Her only relative is Dr. Utsugi, a friend of Dr. Kisaragi who has continued his research.

Natsuko Aki
A police inspector, Natsuko (played by Mikako Ichikawa and voiced by Eva Kaminsky in the English dub) is in charge of the cases related to Panther Claw, which makes her meet the mysterious warrior Cutie Honey. Distrusting Honey, she sets out to strike down both Panther Claw and Honey. She has a serious personality, never smiling and being cold around others. However, by meeting Honey she begins to change and becomes more friendly to others. Her two immediate subordinates are Todoroki and Goki, both of them loyal to Natsuko even in the harshest situations.

Seiji Hayami
Seemingly a regular reporter, Seiji (played by Jun Murakami and voiced by Wayne Grayson in the English dub) follows Honey closely and has a deep knowledge of her, her powers and origin. He always assists Honey whenever she needs it, and seems to be fond of Natsuko as well. His true motives, however, are not clear, but it's certain that he is not a simple reporter.

Gold Claw
Gold claw (played by Hairi Katagiri and voiced by Shannon Conley in the English dub) is the first to battle Cutie Honey. She almost wins but was defeated by the Honey Boomerang while trying to escape the sea bunker she and Honey were battling on. Gold Claw was not killed but later in the movie Sister Jill removes her thinking of her as weak. Gold Claw's left arm has 3 blades to slash and her right has barrels wrapped around her wrist so she is able to shoot Gold Missiles. The long blade on the top of her head may be used to grab and throw her enemies and to fly using it like a helicopter propeller.

Cobalt Claw
Cobalt Claw (played by Shie Kohinata and voiced by Karen Strassman in the English dub) is second in line to fight Cutie Honey. First she stole the body of Honey's boss, then she chases Honey and Nat-Chan into an elevator where she ditches the skin and reveals herself as Cobalt Claw. Cobalt would've been able to win, but she lost due to the I-System reacting to Honey's feelings of vengeance. Ultimately Cobalt Claw was melted. Cobalt Claw usually steals skin to get close to her victim, then she attacks with her 4 long braids, usually by tripping or gagging. If her braids are destroyed, Cobalt Claw uses her contortionist body to unzip extra pockets in her suit that carry extra arms.

Scarlet Claw
Scarlet Claw (played by Mayumi Shintani and voiced by Erica Schroeder in the English dub) is third to fight Honey. Honey and Scarlet fight high up in the sky above the city. Scarlet was obviously powerful, bringing with her an aura that turned the world around her into a shade of red. Scarlet Claw ends up leaving a large hole in several buildings during the fight, including the Office Building where Honey works. Scarlet Claw is defeated when Honey deflects her force beam back at her, and she is destroyed by Black Claw while fleeing.

Black Claw

The final Claw to face Honey is the seemingly androgynous Black Claw (played by Mitsuhiro Oikawa and voiced by Dan Green in the English dub). Black Claw is duochromatic (black and white) and fights with a spinning sword attack and a hidden microphone. During the fight Panther Claw's minions play classical Music and accompany Black Claw as (s)he sings. Black Claw is defeated when Honey uses a point blank Honey Boomerang.

Butler
Sister Jill's butler (played by Toru Tezuka and voiced by Scott Simpson in the English dub) is her most loyal minion.

Sister Jill
Sister Jill (played by Eisuke Sasai and voiced by Madeleine Blaustein in the English dub) is the head of Panther Claw. Her real power and form are unknown. She has a special interest in Honey's AI system.

Reception

Ilya Garger of Time said that Cutie Honey was more like the "tamer" 1970s anime version than the original manga, with campy "over-the-top" acting and "unpolished" CGI effects. Garger added that "much of the film seems devoted to giving people a chance to ogle Eriko Sato in an array of fetching costumes—and in all fairness, she does an excellent job of being oglable."  A Variety review agreed with those points: it called the movie "an embarrassment of kitsches" with "camp pleasures and candy-coated, comic-book giddiness" that has "more humor and a lot less perversion" than the manga, and praised Sato as "a highly marketable plus as the sexy superhero who shouts 'Honey, flash!'", but said its CGI and matte effects were "crude by H'wood standards".

On Allmovie, Jason Gibner wrote that the film's "scenes where Honey lounges around in nothing but a white bra and panties for extended periods of time" give "a feeling of unpleasant and unexpected sleaziness", despite being aimed at children with villains similar to those from Power Rangers/Super Sentai and the childish heroine Honey. While Gibner said that Sato's role as Honey is "hard not to enjoy", he considered the film an unsatisfying "noisy thing" with an incoherent story.

References

Further reading

External links
 (former URL) 
 (former URL) 

 
Cutie Honey  at allcinema
Cutie Honey  at the Japanese Movie Database
Cutie Honey  at Variety Japan (Archived)

Films set in Tokyo
Film
2004 films
2004 martial arts films
Android (robot) films
Films directed by Hideaki Anno
Films with screenplays by Hideaki Anno
Japanese martial arts films
Japanese magical girl films
Live-action films based on manga
Tokusatsu films
2000s Japanese films